Hygrophoropsis purpurascens is a species of fungus in the family Hygrophoropsidaceae. Originally described by Miles Joseph Berkeley and Moses Ashley Curtis in 1869 as Marasmius purpurascens, it was transferred to the genus Hygrophoropsis by Richard Dennis in 1952. It has been collected from Trinidad, Venezuela, Jamaica, and Cuba, where it grows on rotting logs in forests.

References

External links

Hygrophoropsidaceae
Fungi described in 1868
Fungi of Oceania
Fungi of South America
Taxa named by Miles Joseph Berkeley
Fungi without expected TNC conservation status